Škoda (feminine Škodová) is a Czech surname. Notable people with the surname include:

 Blanka Škodová, Czech ice hockey player
 Emil Škoda (1839–1900), founder of the Škoda Works company
 Eva Badura-Skoda (1929–2021), Austrian musicologist
 Henri Skoda (born 1945), French mathematician
 Jarmila Škodová, Czech cross-country skier
 Joseph Škoda (1805–1881), Czech physician
 Leoš Škoda, Czech ski jumper
 Milan Škoda, Czech footballer
 Michal Škoda, Czech footballer
 Paul Badura-Skoda (1927–2019), Austrian pianist
 Nicolis - Eleftherios -Skoda (1988–), Greek Skier

Fictional characters:
 Emil Skoda (Law & Order), fictional psychiatrist

Czech-language surnames